The Florida Boys were a male vocal quartet in Southern gospel music. The group was founded in 1946 by J. G. Whitfield. Originally named The Gospel Melody Quartet, the group was renamed in 1954. From the 1950s until 2007, the group was led by Les Beasley as lead/guitar, Glen Allred as baritone, and Derrell Stewart at piano, and featured many notable tenors and basses. In 1999, the Florida Boys were inducted into the Gospel Music Hall of Fame. The group, led by Charlie Waller in its later years, officially retired in 2016.

History 
Roy Howard, the group's original lead singer, had a heart attack in 1951 and died shortly thereafter. Doyle Wiggins sang lead for about a year. When he left in 1953, he was replaced by Les Beasley. Beasley remained at the lead position through 1999, when he stepped aside and hired Josh Garner to fill the position. Beasley continued to play bass guitar and act as the group's master of ceremonies.

Glen Allred joined as baritone in 1952; Derrell Stewart became the group's pianist in 1956. Allred, Stewart, and Beasley remained at their respective positions for over four decades. During this time, various tenors and basses sang with the group. Billy Todd joined the group as bass singer in the late 1950s, and stayed with the group until 1972. He was replaced by Buddy Liles, who had sung with The Orrell Quartet, The Rhythm Masters Quartet, The Landmark Quartet, and The Rebels Quartet. Liles stayed with the group for over two decades.

The Florida Boys had a nationally syndicated television show, The Gospel Singing Jubilee.

In 1999, the Florida Boys were inducted into the Gospel Music Hall of Fame.

In 2007, the Florida Boys had two personnel changes at relatively the same time, as long-time bass singer Gene McDonald left to work for a bus company, and tenor Harold Reed left to join the Kingsmen Quartet. McDonald was replaced by Butch Owens, and lead singer Josh Garner moved up to the tenor position, with Les once again singing lead for the group.

Then, in June 2007, Les Beasley announced that the legendary quartet would be disbanding the following month. However, he also announced that they would come back together once more for a farewell appearance at the National Quartet Convention in September 2007.

At the "farewell concert" on the main stage at the National Quartet Convention, it was announced that, with the blessing of Allred, Beasley, and Stewart, the Florida Boys name would be continuing on and the mantle was passed to Charlie Waller to continue on with the Florida Boys legacy. Waller continued to operate the Florida Boys until 2016.

The Florida Boys' cover of the song "Love Lifted Me" was used in Richard Linklater's 2011 Film Bernie and was covered in the soundtrack by actor-musician Jack Black.

Personnel 
Tenor:
Guy Dodd (1946–1952)
Buddy Mears (1952–1956)
Coy Cook (1957–1966)
Tommy Atwood (1966–1972)
Laddie Cain (1972–1974)
Jerry Trammell (1975–1979)
Don Thomas (1980–1983)
Paul Adkins
Johnny Cook
Mark Flaker (1982–1983)
Terry Davis (1983–1986)
Rick Busby (1986–1988)
Greg Shockley (1988)
Greg Cook (1988–1995)
Billy Hodges (1995–1997)
Allen Cox (1997–2004)
Harold Reed (2004–2007)
Josh Garner (May 2007–July 2007)
Eddie Broome (2008–2015)
Nathan Parrish (2015–2016)

Lead:
Roy Howard (1946–1951)
Doyle Wiggins (1952–1953)
Les Beasley (1953–1999, May 2007–July 2007)
Josh Garner (1999–2007)
Charlie Waller (2008–2016)

Baritone:
Edward Singletary (1946–1952)
Glen Allred (September 1952 – 1958)
Tommy Fairchild (1958)
Glen Allred (1958–2007)
Buddy Burton (2008–2010)
Chip Cooper (2010–2015)
Jimmy Reno (2015–2016)

Bass
J. G. Whitfield (1946–1958)
George Younce (1958–1959)
Billy Todd (1959–1972)
Buddy Liles (1972–1998)
Gene McDonald (1998–2007)
Butch Owens (February 2007–July 2007)
Chip Cooper (2007–2010)
Paul Hyde (2010–2012)
Joe Lee Armstrong (2012–2016)

Piano:
Ivan “Tiny” Merrill (1946–1954)
Emory Parker (1954)
Livy Freeman (1955)
Derrell Stewart (1956–2007)
Joshua Pope (March 2008–July 2008)
Joshua Pope (2011-2016)

Bass guitar:
Tommy Watwood (1976)
Barry Miller (bef. 1977–aft. 1983)
Les Beasley (2001–2007)

Drums:
Chet Johnson (1973–?)

Various instruments:
Tim Lovelace (for 9 years)

Glen Allred's personal work

Glen Allred and 3 Generations

Glen Allred & 3 Generations is a Southern gospel group. Glen Allred, the former baritone singer for The Florida Boys, is also the baritone singer for The 3 Generations. Randy Allred, the former bass singer for The Dixie Echoes reprises this role. The alto is Cindy Dunn and the soprano is Brandy Allred. Shayne Dunn and Shirley Allred were also featured on the latest album.

Discography:
I Shall Sing
Time To Sing
More Singing Please

References

External links 
"Retired" Florida Boys Official Website
The "New" Florida Boys Official Website

1946 establishments in Florida
2016 disestablishments in Florida
Gospel quartets
Southern gospel performers
Musical groups established in 1946
Musical groups disestablished in 2016